Homesteading is a lifestyle of self-sufficiency. It is characterized by subsistence agriculture, home preservation of food, and may also involve the small scale production of textiles, clothing, and craft work for household use or sale. Pursued in different ways around the world—and in different historical eras—homesteading is generally differentiated from rural village or commune living by isolation (either socially or physically) of the homestead. Use of the term in the United States dates back to the Homestead Act (1862) and before. In sub-Saharan Africa, particularly in nations formerly controlled by the British Empire, a homestead is the household compound for a single extended family. In the UK the terms smallholder and croft are rough synonyms of homesteader.

Modern homesteaders often use renewable energy options including solar and wind power. Many also choose to plant and grow heirloom vegetables and to raise heritage livestock. Homesteading is not defined by where someone lives, such as the city or the country, but by the lifestyle choices they make.

As historical governmental policy

Historically, homesteading has been used by governmental entities (engaged in national expansion) to help settle what were previously unsettled areas, especially in the United States, Canada, and Australia. Guided by legal homestead principles, many of these "homestead acts" were instituted in the 19th and 20th centuries and targeted specific areas, with most being discontinued after a set time-frame or goal.

Renewed interest in homesteading was brought about by U.S. President Franklin D. Roosevelt's program of Subsistence Homesteading in the 1930s and 1940s.

As a social movement

The attractiveness of back-to-the-land movements dates from the Roman era, and has been noted in Asian poetry and philosophy tracts as well (Agriculturalism). In the 1700s, the philosophy of physiocracy developed in France and by the 1800s and early 1900s the philosophy of Agrarianism had taken hold in many places around the world. The ideas of modern homesteading proponents, such as Ralph Borsodi, gained in popularity in the 1960s in the United States. Self-sufficiency movements in the 1990s and 2000s began to apply the concept to urban and suburban settings, known as urban homesteading. According to author John Seymour, "urban homesteading" incorporates small-scale sustainable agriculture and homemaking.

As economic choice

In homesteading, social and government support systems are frequently eschewed in favor of self-reliance and relative deprivation in order to maximize independence and self-determination. The degree of independence occurs along a spectrum, with many homesteaders creating foodstuffs or crafts to appeal to high-end niche markets in order to meet financial needs. Other homesteaders come to the lifestyle following successful careers which provide the funding for land, housing, taxes, and specialized equipment such as solar panels, farm equipment, and electric generators.

Modern government regulation—in the form of building codes, food safety codes, zoning regulations, minimum wage and social security for occasional labor, and town council restrictions on landscaping and animal keeping—can increase the marginal cost of home production of food in areas affected by these restrictions. Careful choice of homesteading location is essential for economic success.

Potential benefits of homesteading include a satisfying standard of living and a healthier, more rewarding lifestyle than more conventional patterns of living.

See also

 Permaculture
 Seasteading

Notes

Further reading
 Cannon, Brian Q., “Homesteading Remembered: A Sesquicentennial Perspective,” Agricultural History, 87 (Winter 2013), 1–29.

External links

 Mid-America Homesteading Conference
 State of Alaska Land Offerings and Remote Recreation Cabins Staking Program
 Encyclopedia of Oklahoma History and Culture – Homesteading

Simple living
Self-sustainability
Western (genre) staples and terminology